Zwickauer Damm is a Berlin U-Bahn station located on the .
Finished in 1970 by R. G. Rümmler it was the end of the line U7 until 1972 when Rudow station was opened. The next station is Rudow.

References

U7 (Berlin U-Bahn) stations
Buildings and structures in Neukölln
Railway stations in Germany opened in 1970